Margret Steckel (born Ehmkendorf, near Mecklenburg, April 26, 1934) is a Luxembourgian writer of German birth. She won the Servais Prize in 1995 for Der Letzte vom Bayrischen Platz.

External links
Biography at the CNL (in Luxembourgish)

1934 births
Living people
Luxembourgian novelists